The Sopranos is an American crime drama television series created by David Chase. The series follows Tony Soprano (James Gandolfini), an Italian-American mobster, as he struggles with various personal and professional obstacles. It also explores Tony's relationships with members of his biological and criminal families, most notably his wife Carmela (Edie Falco) and his protégé, Christopher Moltisanti (Michael Imperioli). The show begins when Tony begins therapy with Dr. Jennifer Melfi (Lorraine Bracco) after suffering a panic attack.

The series premiered on January 10, 1999, on HBO and concluded on June 10, 2007. Broadcast syndication followed in the United States and internationally. The first five seasons of the series each consisted of 13 episodes, while the final season consisted of twenty-one episodes aired in two parts. Unlike most American shows at the time, which typically took a four-month hiatus between seasons, The Sopranos took longer hiatuses between its seasons. Season four, for example, premiered 16 months after the third season finale, and the sixth season returned almost two years after the end of season five. Episodes were broadcast on Sundays at 9:00 pm Eastern Time with an average length of 55 minutes per episode. All six seasons are available on DVD and Blu-ray, with the sixth season being sold in two parts. During the course of the series, 86 episodes of The Sopranos aired over six seasons.

The series was released to widespread critical acclaim and received numerous accolades. It is often credited with ushering in the Second Golden Age of Television and is considered among the most influential series ever. Since its conclusion, The Sopranos has been cited by some as the greatest television series of all time, with TV Guide and Rolling Stone naming it the best series of all time in 2013 and 2022 respectively.

Series overview

Episodes

Season 1 (1999)

Season 2 (2000)

Season 3 (2001)

Notes

Season 4 (2002)

Season 5 (2004)

Season 6 (2006–07)

Ratings

References

External links 
 
 

Lists of American crime drama television series episodes